The Global Apollo Programme was a historic call for a major global science and economics research programme to make carbon-free baseload electricity less costly than electricity from coal by the year 2025.

Inspiration and aims
Launched in June 2015, the project - named for the Apollo Program, which brought together thousands of scientists and engineers to put mankind on the moon - calls for developed nations to commit to spending 0.02% of their GDP, for 10 years, to fund co-ordinated research to solve the challenge. This equates to $150 billion over a decade, roughly the same cost committed to the Apollo Program in 2015 money. Some developed nations, including the UK, already meet the GDP percentage target spend, but many do not and there is little international coordination to maximise the results.

It has been modelled on the more recent International Technology Roadmap for Semiconductors, an international research collaborative that is credited with greatly and swiftly improving the quality and economics of semiconductor manufacture.

Key areas of focus
Renewable energy - in particular that derived from solar and wind sources
 Energy storage
 Smart grids
 hydrogen vehicles

Key people

Launch report authors
The initiative is spearheaded by the chemist Professor Sir David King, former Government Chief Scientific Adviser to HM Government. Amongst the Apollo group are economists Professor Lord Stern (author of The Stern Review) and Lord O'Donnell (former Cabinet Secretary), businessmen Lord Turner and Lord Browne (former Chief Executive of BP), cosmologist and astrophysicist Professor Lord Rees (former President of the Royal Society) and labour economist Lord Layard.

Endorsers
The following were signatories on an open letter published to The Guardian newspaper, alongside the launch report authors, in September 2015.

 Sir David Attenborough (video endorsement)
 Professor Brian Cox, University of Manchester
 Paul Polman, CEO of Unilever
 Ed Davey, Former UK Secretary of State for Energy and Climate Change
 Professor Sir Brian Hoskins, Chair of the Grantham Institute
 Mark Kenber, CEO of The Climate Group
 Ben Goldsmith Founder, Menhaden Capital
 Zac Goldsmith, British MP and London mayoral candidate
 Professor Martin Siegert, Co-director of the Grantham Institute
 Professor Joanna Haigh, Co-director, Grantham Institute; vice-president of Royal Meteorological Society
 Peter Bakker, President of the World Business Council for Sustainable Development
 Professor John Shepherd, University of Southampton
 Dr Arunabha Ghosh, Founder-CEO, Council on Energy, Environment and Water

Professor Jeffrey Sachs, Professor of Sustainable Development and Director of the Earth Institute at Columbia University has separately publicly endorsed the programme.

Professor Sir David King has publicly stated that Prime Minister of India Narendra Modi is "keen" on the programme.

Reaction

Key dates
 The programme was discussed at the Energy Ministers run-up meeting to the 41st G7 summit.
 It featured in the Leader's Declaration of the 41st G7 summit itself.

See also
 Mission Innovation
 Breakthrough Energy
 Keeling Curve

References 

 
Research projects
Government research